Vorobyovo is a rural locality (a village) in Kochyovskoye Rural Settlement, Kochyovsky District, Perm Krai, Russia. The population was 66 as of 2010. There are 4 streets.

Geography 
Vorobyovo is located 18 km northwest of Kochyovo (the district's administrative centre) by road. Dema is the nearest rural locality.

References 

Rural localities in Kochyovsky District